James Blair Sherwood (August 8, 1933 – May 18, 2020) was an American-born, British-based businessman, and the founder of  Sea Containers.

Early life
James Blair Sherwood was born in Newcastle, Pennsylvania, the son of William Sherwood, a patent attorney, and Florence. He grew up in Lexington, Kentucky and earned a degree in economics from Yale University. Sherwood learned about shipping first in the United States Navy, spending three years as a cargo officer, and then working for United States Lines and CTI for six years.

Business career
In 1965, Sherwood founded Bermuda-based, New York Stock Exchange listed, London-headquartered shipping company Sea Containers with initial capital of $100,000. Over forty years Sherwood expanded Sea Containers from a supplier of leased cargo containers, into various shipping companies, as well as expanding the company into luxury hotels and railway trains, including the Venice-Simplon Orient Express and Great North Eastern Railway that operated the InterCity East Coast franchise.

Although valued with a net worth of £60million in the 2004 Sunday Times Rich List, as Sea Containers hit financial troubles, he resigned as Co-Chief Executive Officer from each of his companies in 2006. He continued as a Director of Orient Express Hotels Ltd until retiring on 9 June 2011. He was later designated as Founder and Chairman Emeritus.

Personal life
In 1977, Sherwood married the writer and botanist Shirley Cross. Her sons, Simon and Charles, from her previous marriage adopted his surname.

He died on May 18, 2020 of complications after abdominal surgery, aged 86.

References

External links
Portrait Sculpture of James Sherwood by John W Mills

1933 births
2020 deaths
Military personnel from Lexington, Kentucky
Yale University alumni
United States Navy officers
American chief executives of travel and tourism industry companies
American expatriates in the United Kingdom